The 1975–76 County Championship was the 34th season of the Liga IV, the fourth tier of the Romanian football league system. The champions of each county association play against one from a neighboring county in a play-off  to gain promotion to Divizia C.

Promotion play-off 
Teams promoted to Divizia C without a play-off matches as teams from less represented counties in the third division.

 (AG) Dacia Pitești
 (IF) Viitorul Chirnogi
 (TR) Petrolul Videle
 (GL) Metalosport Galați

 (IL) Victoria Țăndărei
 (SJ) Victoria Zalău
 (MS) Mureșul Luduș
 (BZ) Recolta Săhăteni

The matches was played on 4 and 11 July 1976. 

|-
||4–0||0–1
||2–0||1–3
||4–1||1–3
||3–0||0–2
||1–0||0–2
||0–1||0–3
||5–0||2–5
||4–0||0–2
||6–0||1–1
||2–0||2–2
||0–2||1–4
||3–0||2–1
||1–0||0–2 
||5–1||3–0
||2–1||0–2
||2–1||1–3
|}

County leagues

Arad County

Harghita County

Hunedoara County

Maramureș County

Neamț County

Olt County 
Championship final

||2–1||4–2

Laminorul IPA Slatina won the 1975–76 Olt County Championship and qualify for promotion play-off in Divizia C.

Prahova County

See also 
 1975–76 Divizia A
 1975–76 Divizia B
 1975–76 Divizia C

References

External links
 FRF

Liga IV seasons
4